The 2015–16 CEV Women's Champions League was the 57th edition of the CEV Women's Champions League, the highest level of European club volleyball.

Teams
The number of participants on the basis of ranking list for European Cup Competitions:

Format

League round
24 teams were drawn to 6 pools of 4 teams each.
The 1st and 2nd qualified for the Playoff 12
The organizer of the Final Four were determined after the end of the League Round and qualified directly for the Final Four.
The team of the organizer of the Final Four was replaced by the best 3rd ranked team with the best score.

The next 4 third-placed teams will move to the Challenge Round of the CEV Cup.

The remaining teams will be eliminated.

In the League Round, the placing of the teams is determined by the number of matches won.
In case of a tie in the number of matches won by two or more teams, they will be ranked on the basis of the following criteria:
match points;
set quotient (the number of total sets won divided by the number of total sets lost);
points quotient (the number of total points scored divided by the number of total points lost);
results of head-to-head matches between the teams in question.

Playoff round
The playoffs will consist of two rounds: Playoff 12 and Playoff 6. Each round is played in two legs.

If the teams are tied after two legs, a "Golden Set" is played. The winner is the team that first obtains 15 points, provided that the points difference between the two teams is at least 2 points (thus, the Golden Set is similar to a tiebreak set in a normal match).

At each leg, points are awarded to the teams in the same manner as in the Group Round (3 for 3:0 or 3:1, 2 for 3:2 etc.). So, if team A defeat team B in the first leg 3:0 and lose in the second leg 1:3, team A does not advance to the next round (as it would have been expected on the basis of analogy with football competitions), but the two teams are tied with 3 points each, and a Golden Set is played.

The three teams that win in Playoff 6 round advance to the Final Four along with the organizer of the Final Four.

Pools composition
The drawing of lots was held in Vienna, Austria on 2 July 2015. The 24 participated teams of the competition were divided by 4 pots based on the latest European Cups Ranking List and their National Rankings. Exception, the teams which received wild cards had to be in the 4th pot.

Squads

League round

All times are local.

Pool A

|}

|}

Pool B

|}

|}

Pool C

|}

|}

Pool D

|}

|}

Pool E

|}

|}

Pool F

|}

|}

Ranking of third-placed teams

|}

Playoffs

All times are local.

Playoff 12

|}

First leg

|}

Second leg

|}

Playoff 6

|}

First leg

|}

Second leg

|}

Final four
Organizer:  Pomì Casalmaggiore
Venue:  PalaGeorge, Montichiari, Italy
All times are Central European Summer Time (UTC+02:00).
In case that two teams from the same country qualify for the semifinals, they will have to play each other.

Semifinals

|}

3rd place match

|}

Final

|}

Final standing

Awards

Most Valuable Player
  Francesca Piccinini (Pomì Casalmaggiore)
Best Setter
  Carli Lloyd (Pomì Casalmaggiore)
Best Outside Spikers
  Kim Yeon-Koung (Fenerbahçe Grundig Istanbul)
  Kimberly Hill (VakıfBank Istanbul)

Best Middle Blockers
  Eda Erdem Dündar (Fenerbahçe Grundig Istanbul)
  Jovana Stevanović (Pomì Casalmaggiore)
Best Opposite Spiker
  Margareta Kozuch (Pomì Casalmaggiore)
Best Libero
  Gizem Örge (VakıfBank Istanbul)

References

External links
Official website

CEV Women's Champions League
CEV Women's Champions League
CEV Women's Champions League